Sacred Mountain National Park is a national park in Marawi, Lanao del Sur in the Southern Philippines. The  national park and protected area, located in Brgys. Guimba and Papandayan, was established on August 5, 1965, by Republic Act no. 4190. Activities in the park include birdwatching and trekking to the mountaintop where a pond is located.

Non-native flora in the park include African Tulip trees and Buyo Buyo plants.

See also
List of national parks of the Philippines

References

National parks of the Philippines
Marawi
Geography of Lanao del Sur
Protected areas established in 1965
1965 establishments in the Philippines
Tourist attractions in Lanao del Sur